The 22nd Annual Nickelodeon Kids' Choice Awards was held on March 28, 2009, on the Nell and John Wooden Court of Pauley Pavilion, with Dwayne Johnson as host. Voting commenced on March 2, 2009. Performers and presenters have been listed at the official site. The show marks the last time that the Nickelodeon Orange Blimp was used on the Kids' Choice Awards logo for 4 years. The blimp was not used on the Kids' Choice Awards logo again until the 2013 show.

According to Nickelodeon, the show was broadcast in more than "228 million households across Nickelodeon's 50 channels in
Europe, Russia, the Middle East, Asia, Australia and Latin America." It had 7.7 million viewers. More votes than ever were cast for this year's KCAs. A record 91.1 million votes were cast on Nickelodeon websites.

Prior to the live telecast, Lily Collins, Pick Boy and JJ hosted the "orange carpet", featuring celebrity interviews and a live performance by Miranda Cosgrove outside Pauley Pavilion.

Presenters and performers, and stunts for KCA 2009

Host
 Dwayne Johnson
Presenters
 Sandra Bullock
 John Cena
 Lily Collins
 Miranda Cosgrove
 Chace Crawford
 Cameron Diaz
 Zac Efron
 America Ferrera
 Megan Fox
 Hugh Jackman
 Shia LaBeouf
 Queen Latifah
 George Lopez
 Keke Palmer
 Josh Peck
 Chris Pine
 Amy Poehler
 Emma Roberts
 Chris Rock
 Fred Roggin
 Ben Stiller
 Marlon Wayans
 Owen Wilson
 Alex Wolff
 Nat Wolff
Performers
 Jonas Brothers – Main program "SOS"/"Burnin' Up"
 The Pussycat Dolls – Main program "Jai Ho! (You Are My Destiny)"/"When I Grow Up"

Slime Stunts
 Sandra Bullock
 Will Ferrell
 Hugh Jackman
 Dwayne Johnson
 Jonas Brothers
 Jesse McCartney

Announcer
 Tom Kenny

Burp Zone
 Jerry Trainor
 Matt Shively
 Ashley Argota
 Victoria Justice
 Nathan Kress
 Jennette McCurdy

Special Appearance
 Justin Timberlake – Taught Dwayne Johnson how to dance (in a commercial).
 Jesse McCartney – Opened the doors for Dwayne Johnson.
 Miranda Cosgrove – Helped Dwayne Johnson get the codes and helped him get the blimps (in a commercial).
 Tom Kenny – Told Dwayne Johnson he had to find a key to unlock the slime.
 Jonas Brothers – Revealed as the "Slime gods" who cause them to become slimed.

Nicktoon Appearances
 Bessie Higgenbottom (voiced by Amy Poehler) from The Mighty B!
 SpongeBob SquarePants and Patrick Star (archive footage)
 Timmy Turner and Poof from The Fairly OddParents
 Otis (voiced by Chris Hardwick), Pip, and Pig from Back at the Barnyard
 The Penguins of Madagascar

Winners and nominees
Winners are listed first, in bold. Other nominees are in alphabetical order.

Movies

Television

Music

Sports

Miscellaneous

Removal
 Chris Brown was nominated for Favorite Song and Male Singer but was removed from the voting, due largely to his altercation with Rihanna in February.

References

External links
 

Nickelodeon Kids' Choice Awards
2009 in American television
2009 in California
2009 television awards
2009 in Los Angeles
2009 awards in the United States
Television shows directed by Beth McCarthy-Miller